Matt and Jenny (or Matt and Jenny on the Wilderness Trail) is a Canadian television series of 26 episodes of 25 minutes each, broadcast on Global starting October 21, 1979.

A French-language dub of the show, titled Les routes de l'amitié, later aired on La Chaîne française, Ontario's then-new francophone educational service, in 1986. American television producer Norman Lear also purchased American rights to the show in 1980; however, he did not indicate at the time whether he planned to syndicate the existing Canadian show or produce an Americanized remake, and neither plan subsequently materialized. However, the series later aired in the United States on Nickelodeon circa 1981-1983.

The series won an award for Best Television Series from the Canadian Film and Television Association in 1979.

Synopsis 
Two English children, Matt and Jenny Tanner, and their mother depart for the New World from Bristol, England. During the voyage, their mother dies of typhoid fever. The two children arrive in Canada and begin a search for their uncle Bill Tanner, who arrived before they had.

Cast 
 Derrick Jones – Matt
 Megan Follows – Jenny
 Neil Dainard – Adam Cardston
 Duncan Regehr – Kit

Filming locations
 Mainly shot at the Toronto International Studios lot at Kleinburg, Ontario.

Episode list

References

External links
 

Global Television Network original programming
1970s Western (genre) television series
1979 Canadian television series debuts
1980 Canadian television series endings
1970s Canadian children's television series
1980s Canadian children's television series
Fictional duos